Szántód is a village in Somogy county, Hungary situated between Balatonföldvár and Zamárdi on the shore of the Lake Balaton. The village is known for its ferry, ferryboats, views of Tihany from Szántód and the Szántódpuszta Tourist and Cultural Center which is a village museum ("skanzen").
It's apprpximately 13.4 km from Siófok, the major town of the area, 65.8 km from Kaposvár, the capital of Somogy County and 117 km from Budapest, the capital of Hungary.

References

External links 
 Street map (Hungarian)

Populated places in Somogy County
History of Somogy